Paolo Della Santa (born 11 September 1973) is a Swiss hurdler. He competed in the men's 110 metres hurdles at the 2000 Summer Olympics.

References

1973 births
Living people
Athletes (track and field) at the 2000 Summer Olympics
Swiss male hurdlers
Olympic athletes of Switzerland
Place of birth missing (living people)